Gonzalo Javier Rodríguez Prado (born 10 April 1984), also known as simply Gonzalo, is an Argentine former professional footballer who played as a centre back.

After starting out at San Lorenzo, he spent most of his career with Villarreal, appearing in 253 official games over the course of eight La Liga seasons (nine goals). He also played five years in the Italian Serie A, with Fiorentina.

Club career

San Lorenzo
Born in Buenos Aires, Gonzalo started playing with San Lorenzo de Almagro. He made his Primera División debut on 26 July 2002 at the age of only 18, against Rosario Central.

At age 20, Rodríguez had already represented Argentina, previously having appeared at the 2003 FIFA World Youth Championship with the under-20 team.

Villarreal
In July 2004, Rodríguez joined Spain's Villarreal CF, being an undisputed starter in his first two seasons and renewing his link for a further five years. However, after the surprise elimination from the UEFA Intertoto Cup at the hands of NK Maribor, in which he was sent off, and a mere month into the league season, he suffered a serious injury, tearing the cruciate ligament in his right knee; after returning to activity in April 2007, he suffered the same injury two months later.

Rodríguez returned to good form in the 2008–09 campaign, often partnering Uruguayan Diego Godín and appearing in 48 La Liga games in two seasons combined, with Villarreal always qualifying to the UEFA Europa League, finishing fifth and seventh respectively. On 7 April 2011, in the Europa League's quarter-finals against FC Twente, he broke his fibula after a tough challenge by Marc Janko, being rushed to hospital in an ambulance and lost for the remainder of the season.

Fiorentina
In early August 2012, following Villarreal's relegation, Gonzalo joined Italian side ACF Fiorentina along with teammate Borja Valero. He scored six Serie A goals from 35 appearances in his first year, helping to a final fourth place and the subsequent qualification to the Europa League.

In 2015–16, Rodríguez was named new team captain by new manager Paulo Sousa. He made his 200th competitive appearance for the club on 9 April 2017, and marked the occasion with his 25th goal in a 2–2 away draw against U.C. Sampdoria.

Return to San Lorenzo
In July 2017, Rodríguez returned to San Lorenzo on a free transfer. On 23 June 2020, the 36-year-old announced his retirement.

Career statistics

Club

International

International goals
Scores and results list Argentina's goal tally first.

Honours
San Lorenzo
Copa Sudamericana: 2002

Villarreal
UEFA Intertoto Cup: 2004

Individual
Fiorentina All-time XI

References

External links
Fiorentina official profile

 

1984 births
Living people
Footballers from Buenos Aires
Argentine footballers
Association football defenders
Argentine Primera División players
San Lorenzo de Almagro footballers
La Liga players
Villarreal CF players
Serie A players
ACF Fiorentina players
Argentina youth international footballers
Argentina under-20 international footballers
Argentina international footballers
2005 FIFA Confederations Cup players
Argentine expatriate footballers
Expatriate footballers in Spain
Expatriate footballers in Italy
Argentine expatriate sportspeople in Spain
Argentine expatriate sportspeople in Italy